Rombout is a Dutch masculine given name, equivalent to English Rumbold. It is of Germanic origin, containing the Old Saxon elements -hrôm- ("fame", Dutch roem)  and -bald-  ("brave"). It is also possible that the first element comes from -Rûma- ("Rome"), a place name that also featured in old Germanic names. Early source usually Latinized Saint Rombout's name as Rumoldus, as in the first known mention in a pre-927 grant by Charles the Simple, mentioning that the Mechelen abbey had been built in his honor ("in honorem S. Rumoldi martyris constructam").

 Saint Rombout (died between 580 and 655), in English known as "Rumbold of Mechelen"
 Rombout Hogerbeets (1561–1625), Dutch statesman
 Rombout II Keldermans (1460–1531), Belgian architect
 Rombout van Troyen (1605–1655), Dutch landscape painter
 Rombout Verhulst (1624–1698), Flemish-Dutch sculptor
 Catheryna Rombout Brett (1687–1764), American businesswoman

See also
Rombouts, patronymic surname
Rombout House, a historic home in Poughkeepsie, New York, on land bought by Francis Rombouts in 1683
 Rombout Patent, a grant issued by King James II of England in 1685

References

Dutch masculine given names